Savanna National Forest was established by the U.S. Forest Service in Illinois on June 5, 1925 from part of the Savanna Military Reservation, now the Savanna Army Depot, with .  On June 15, 1926 Savanna was renamed Bellevue-Savanna National Forest. The forest was abolished on July 15, 1954.

References

External links
Forest History Society
Listing of the National Forests of the United States and Their Dates (from the Forest History Society website) Text from Davis, Richard C., ed. Encyclopedia of American Forest and Conservation History. New York: Macmillan Publishing Company for the Forest History Society, 1983. Vol. II, pp. 743-788.

Former National Forests that were military bases
Former National Forests of Illinois